The Montserrat Democratic Party (MDP) was a political party in Montserrat.

History
The original Montserrat Democratic Party was established in 1958 and led by Eric Kelsick. It was only the second party founded in the country after the Montserrat Labour Party. In the May 1958 elections it put forward two candidates, but received only 12% of the vote and failed to win a seat.

The party was re-established in 2006. In the elections held later that year, it received 24.4% of the vote, winning one seat in the Legislative Council. Following the elections, it joined a coalition government with the New People's Liberation Movement and an independent MP. Although the NPLM had won three seats, MDP leader Lowell Lewis became Chief Minister.

The party did not contest the 2009 elections, although Lewis ran as an independent and was elected. The party also failed to contest the 2014 elections.

References

External links
Official website 

Political parties in Montserrat
1958 establishments in Montserrat
Political parties established in 1958
2006 establishments in Montserrat
Political parties established in 2006